Karl Bertil Emanuel Nordahl (26 July 1917 – 1 December 1998) was a Swedish footballer who played as a midfielder. He was also a football manager.

Playing career 
He played for Degerfors IF and Atalanta B.C. He won the gold medal at the 1948 Summer Olympics, along with his brothers Knut and Gunnar Nordahl. After the Olympics, he and Gunnar transferred to Italy and, due to being in a professional football league while the Swedish football was all amateur, they were not called to the 1950 FIFA World Cup. He was capped 15 times for the Sweden national football team.

Managerial career 
After his playing career, he coached Örebro SK and IK Brage.

References

External links

Profile

1917 births
1998 deaths
Swedish footballers
Sweden international footballers
Swedish expatriate footballers
Olympic footballers of Sweden
Olympic gold medalists for Sweden
Footballers at the 1948 Summer Olympics
Degerfors IF players
Atalanta B.C. players
Allsvenskan players
Serie A players
Expatriate footballers in Italy
Swedish football managers
Örebro SK managers
IK Brage managers
Olympic medalists in football
Medalists at the 1948 Summer Olympics
Association football midfielders
Sportspeople from Västerbotten County